The Civilian Review and Complaints Commission for the Royal Canadian Mounted Police (CRCC) is an independent agency. Created by Parliament in 1988, the Commission ensures that public complaints made about the conduct of RCMP members are examined fairly and impartially. The Commission receives complaints from the public and conducts reviews when complainants are not satisfied with the RCMP’s handling of their complaints.

The Commission is not part of the RCMP.

In 2022, the government proposed a plan to reform the commission into the proposed "Public Complaints and Review Commission" and to assign the new commission the added responsibility of overseeing complaints against the Canada Border Services Agency.

Mandate
As set out in Parts VI and VII of the Royal Canadian Mounted Police Act, the mandate of the Commission is to:

 receive complaints from the public about the conduct of RCMP members;
 conduct reviews when complainants are not satisfied with the RCMP's handling of their complaints;
 initiate complaints and investigations into RCMP conduct when it is in the public interest to do so;
 review specified activities;
 report findings and make recommendations; and
 promote public awareness of the complaint process.

Guiding Principles

 Impartial and independent
 Accountable to the Canadian public
 Fair, equitable and credible in addressing complaints and conducting reviews, investigations and hearings
 Timely and efficient complaint process
 Foster a respectful, productive and healthy workplace
 Foster public awareness of the complaint process
 Representative of people served

Resources
CRCC Website
Complaint and Review Process
Complaint and Review Process Flowchart
Jurisdiction
Enhancing Royal Canadian Mounted Police Accountability Act 
Royal Canadian Mounted Police Act

References

Royal Canadian Mounted Police
1988 establishments in Canada
Government agencies established in 1988
Government watchdog groups in Canada
Police oversight organizations
Independent government agencies of Canada
Federal departments and agencies of Canada